Antonio Castejón Espinosa (1896, Manila – 1969) was a Spanish army officer from the Army of Africa who fought for the Nationalists in the Spanish Civil War. He was born in the Philippines which was a Spanish colony.

At the start of the Civil War Major Castejón's unit of the Spanish Legion joined the rebels and took control of Tetuán in Spanish Morocco. In August 1936 he commanded one of the four Nationalist columns that took Badajoz by storm. He was present at the subsequent relief of Toledo and was wounded in the fighting around Madrid. Promoted to Colonel in 1937.

Castejón was given command of the 102nd division of the Army of Andalusia during the Battle of the Ebro. He was promoted to General at war's end.  From 1939 to 1942, he commanded the Tercio «Duque de Alba» of the Spanish Foreign Legion.

Notes

References
 

1896 births
1969 deaths
People from Badajoz
Spanish generals
Spanish military personnel of the Spanish Civil War (National faction)
Francoist Spain
Spanish people in the Spanish Philippines